Senator McGee may refer to:

Gale W. McGee (1915–1992), United States Senator for Wyoming
John McGee (politician) (born 1973), Idaho State Senate
Kate Brophy McGee (fl. 2010s), Arizona State Senate
Patricia McGee (1934–2005), New York State Senate
Thomas M. McGee (born 1955), Massachusetts State Senate

See also
Dan R. McGehee (1883–1962), Mississippi State Senate